White Oak Township is a township in Henry County, in the U.S. state of Missouri.

White Oak Township was established in 1868, taking its name from White Oak Creek.

References

Townships in Missouri
Townships in Henry County, Missouri